
Year 334 BC was a year of the pre-Julian Roman calendar. At the time, it was known as the Year of the Consulship of Caudinus and Calvinus (or, less frequently, year 420 Ab urbe condita). The denomination 334 BC for this year has been used since the early medieval period, when the Anno Domini calendar era became the prevalent method in Europe for naming years.

Events 
 By place 

 Persian Empire 
 The king of Caria, Pixodarus, dies and is succeeded by his son-in-law, Orontobates.
 As the Persian satraps have gathered for a war council at Zeleia, Memnon argues that it is preferable for the Persians to avoid a pitched battle and adopt a scorched earth tactic. Arsites, the satrap of Hellespontine Phrygia, will not allow his land to be burned and agrees with other satraps to reject this cautious advice.

 Macedonia 
 King Alexander III of Macedonia crosses the Dardanelles, leaving Antipater, who has already faithfully served his father, Philip II, as his deputy in Greece with over 13,000 men. Alexander himself commands about 30,000 foot soldiers and over 5,000 cavalry, of whom nearly 14,000 are Macedonians and about 7,000 are allies sent by the Greek League.
 May – Alexander wins a major victory against the Persians commanded by the Greek mercenary Memnon of Rhodes, in the Battle of the Granicus near the Sea of Marmara. A large number of King Darius III's Greek mercenaries are massacred, but 2,000 survivors are sent back to Macedonia in chains.
 Alexander accepts the surrender of the Persian provincial capital of Sardis (and its treasury) and proceeds down the Ionian coast.
 At Halicarnassus, Alexander successfully undertakes the first of many sieges, eventually forcing his opponents, the mercenary captain Memnon of Rhodes and the Persian satrap of Caria, Orontobates, to withdraw by sea. Alexander leaves Caria in the hands of Ada, who was the ruler of Caria before being deposed by her brother-in-law, Pixodarus.
 Alexander's victory exposes western Asia Minor to the Macedonians, and most of the cities in the region hasten to open their gates. The Ionian city of Miletus defies Alexander and he has to subdue it through a siege.

 Italy 
 Alexander of Epirus, at the request of the colony of Taras (Tarentum) crosses over into Italy, to aid them against the Lucanians and Bruttii. He wins victories over the Italian Samnite tribes.

 China 
 The rulers of Wei and Qi agree to recognize each other as kings, formalizing the independence of the Warring States and the powerlessness of the Zhou Dynasty.

Births 
 Zeno of Citium, Greek philosopher and the father of Stoicism (approximate date) (d. c. 262 BC)

Deaths 
 Pixodarus, King of Caria

References